Putty may refer to:
 Putty, plastic material
 PuTTY, ssh/telnet client and terminal emulator
 Putty (computer game)
 Silly Putty, children's toy
 Putty, New South Wales, a small town north west of Sydney
 Putty Patrollers, from Mighty Morphin' Power Rangers
 "Jeweler's putty", tin (IV) oxide, formerly known as stannic oxide
 Putty Thing, the villain in The Mask: Animated Series

See also
 Putti (disambiguation)
 Puttee, covering for the lower part of the leg from the ankle to the knee